Jenna Persons (born February 18, 1983) is an American attorney and politician serving as a member of the Florida House of Representatives from the 78th district. She assumed office on November 3, 2020.

Early life and education 
Persons was born in Naples, Florida and raised in Fort Myers, where she graduated from Fort Myers Senior High School. She earned a Bachelor of Arts degree in journalism and another in government from Evangel University, followed by a Juris Doctor from the George Washington University Law School.

Career 
Since 2012, Persons has been an attorney and partner Strayhorn & Persons, where she specializes in business law, real estate, planning, and zoning. She was elected to the Florida House of Representatives in November 2020.

References 

1983 births
People from Naples, Florida
People from Fort Myers, Florida
Evangel University alumni
George Washington University Law School alumni
Florida lawyers
Republican Party members of the Florida House of Representatives
Women state legislators in Florida
Living people